Andreas Salat (born 5 June 1964) is an Austrian ice hockey player. He competed in the men's tournament at the 1988 Winter Olympics.

References

1964 births
Living people
Olympic ice hockey players of Austria
Ice hockey players at the 1988 Winter Olympics
Ice hockey people from Vienna